Hans-Dieter Lucas (born 11 October 1959) is a German diplomat. He is currently serving as Ambassador of Germany to France and Monaco.

Education 
Lucas studied history, political science, law and Catholic theology in the Rhenish Friedrich Wilhelm University of Bonn.

Career 
 From 1987 to 1989 he worked in the political department of the Federal Foreign Office.
 From 1989 to 1991 he has served in the economic department at the Embassy of Germany, Moscow.
 From 1991 to 1995 he has served in the political department (Baltic States) of the Federal Foreign Office.
 From 1995 to 1998 he was Head of the personal office of former Federal Minister for Foreign Affairs Hans-Dietrich Genscher.
 From 1998 to 1999 he was Head of the speechwriting staff of former Federal Minister for Foreign Affairs Klaus Kinkel.
 From 1999 to 2003 he worked in the political department at the Embassy of Germany, Washington, D.C.
 From 2003 to 2006 he served as Head of division for Central-, Southeastern, Eastern Europe, South Caucasus, Central Asia of the Foreign and Security Policy Department of German Chancellery.
 From 2006 to 2010 Lucas was Director for Eastern Europe, the Caucasus and Central Asia of the Federal Foreign Office.
 From 2010 to 2011 he was Representative of the Federal Republic of Germany in the Political and Security Committee of the EU.
 He served from 2011 to 2015 as political director of the Federal Foreign Office.
 From 2015 to 2020 he was the Permanent Representative of Germany to NATO.
 In 2020 he was appointed  Ambassador of Germany to France and Monaco.

References 

1959 births
Living people
Ambassadors of Germany to France
Permanent Representatives of Germany to NATO
People from Jülich
Officers Crosses of the Order of Merit of the Federal Republic of Germany
Chevaliers of the Légion d'honneur
University of Bonn alumni
20th-century German diplomats
21st-century German diplomats